Streptomyces smyrnaeus is a halotolerant bacterium species from the genus of Streptomyces which has been isolated from pond sediments from a salt lake in Izmir in Turkey.

See also 
 List of Streptomyces species

References

Further reading

External links
Type strain of Streptomyces smyrnaeus at BacDive -  the Bacterial Diversity Metadatabase

smyrnaeus
Bacteria described in 2014